DOGE is an academic bibliographic database, which is maintained by INIST (Institute of Scientific and Technical Information), French National Centre for Scientific Research (CNRS), in collaboration with the "Réseau d’Information en Gestion des Entreprises" (Information  Network  for Business Management)  – under the coordination of the Institut Européen de Données Financières, EUROFIDAI (European Financial  data Institute),  and the CNRS Department of Humanities and Social Sciences (SHS). DOGE covers research documents in all aspects of business management with special emphasis on European literature.

See also 
 DOGE's page on the INIST official website
 INIST (official website)
 EUROFIDAI Homepage

Bibliographic databases and indexes
Databases in France
Full-text scholarly databases